Technologies Nawmal Inc., formerly known as Nawmal Ltd., and simply known as Nawmal, is a Canadian digital entertainment company based in Montreal, Canada, that produces do-it-yourself animation software for the web and desktop and turned words from a script into an animated movie using text-to-speech and animation technologies.

Nawmal's predecessor, Xtranormal, was very similar to the current result. On June 28, 2013, the company announced that they would be shutting down its online services on July 31, 2013. They encouraged users to complete their unfinished movies and download their completed movies before that date. After the shutdown, the website had been replaced by a holding page in a gray background showing Xtranormal's logo above a set of media player control buttons and the word "pause", hinting at a future relaunch. However, in October 2013, the placeholder was gone and the website was shut down entirely. In April 2014, Nawmal Ltd. acquired the rights to Xtranormal's IP and began releasing a rebranded version of a similar software.

History 
Nawmal's predecessor, Xtranormal, was launched after four years of software development. It was established as a storyboarding tool for writers and film directors. The original intent was to allow users to create videos by choosing from a menu of pre-designed characters and sets, and scripting their own dialogue.

Xtranormal's State platform allowed casual users to create their own animated videos, and could be downloaded for free and run offline. At some point, State was replaced with a newer version of the animation software called Xtranormal Desktop (or, XD). Like State, XD was free to download from the Xtranormal website, but is no longer available after Xtranormal's shutdown. Xtranormal also released a web-based animation software tool called Movie Maker (alternately known as "Text-To-Movie"). Movie Maker offers users a more limited subset of functionality in exchange for the convenience of a web browser. Xtranormal videos could at one time be created through an interface directly on the YouTube website.

In 2011, Xtranormal launched a subscription service called Xtranormal for Education. This program aimed to empower teachers and students by giving them a new way to express themselves in the classroom. Teachers could create and grade animation-based assignments directly from their web browsers. Xtranormal for Education was implemented in K–12, university and special needs classes all over the world.

In January 2013, Xtranormal's CEO at the time told Forbes magazine that Xtranormal had a viable web subscription model, including Tellagami app, but they believed that the real opportunity for growth was now in mobile. On June 28, 2013, the company announced that they would be shutting down its online services including all current subscriptions, points plans and existing services as of July 31, 2013. They encouraged users to use up existing points and to publish and download created movies before that date.

Xtranormal's online services were taken down shortly after, with the content of their web site replaced by a holding page showing the company's logo, a set of media player control buttons, and the word "pause", but in early October, the placeholder was gone, thus their site was shut down altogether. Its official YouTube, Facebook, and Twitter pages had also been deleted. The site was briefly home to a store called "The College Shop" in November 2013.

In July 2014, it was announced that the assets of Xtranormal had been acquired by Nawmal Ltd. As of 2016, Xtranormal's new parent company, Nawmal Ltd. has split Xtranormal into 2 different animators named after the company itself, both just like Xtranormal, except one being for professional use and one being for education.

As of 2020, Xtranormal had a new feature of Nawmal Ltd. but is introducing new VR, AR, advanced customization and more.

Legacy
Some user-created videos reached more than a million views on YouTube.
In 2010, the short film Sleeping with Charlie Kaufman by director J Roland Kelly, animated entirely with Nawmal, premiered at the Little Rock Film Festival and was shown at The Rome International Film Festival in Rome, Georgia. Xtranormal videos once formed a recurring feature on the late night FNC talk show Red Eye w/ Greg Gutfeld, and were featured as part of a GEICO advertising campaign. The Micros series of shorts about the world of online has been the most popular Xtranormal web-series on YouTube.  Some videos created on Nawmal have appeared on shows such as The Colbert Report, The Kroll Show and Howard 100.

See also 
 Vyond
 Muvizu
 Moviestorm 
 iClone 
 PowToon

References

External links 
 Nawmal Ltd.

Marketing companies established in 2008
Internet properties established in 2008
2013 disestablishments in New Jersey
3D animation software
Online mass media companies of the United States
Machinima
Companies based in Newark, New Jersey
Websites about animation
Defunct companies based in New Jersey
Re-established companies